"Freak Like Me" is a 1995 single by Adina Howard, also remixed by Tru Faith & Dub Conspiracy and covered by Sugababes.

Freak Like Me may also refer to:

Freak Like Me (TV series), 2010 reality series on BBC Three
"Freak Like Me", a song by Halestorm on the album The Strange Case Of...
"Freak Like Me", a song by Brook Candy on the album Sexorcism
Freak Like Me, a book by the Jim Rose Circus